Brigitte Fournier (born 14 June 1961) in Sion, is a soprano singer known in Valais in Switzerland for her skills in lyric opera. Her voice, described as a lyric soprano, is best suited to composers such as Mozart and Richard Strauss

Life

Training 
She studied at the conservatory of Bern in the class of Jakob Stämpfli, where she obtained a teaching diploma in singing in 1983. She continued her education at the Folkwang Universität of Essen in Germany. She then studied at the Lausanne Conservatory with Juliette Bise, where she obtained her first prize in virtuosity in 1987. She completed her training at the Biel Opera School and obtained her first role in 1987 as Naiade in Ariadne auf Naxos by Richard Strauss at the Théâtre municipal and at the Lausanne Opera.

Career 
From 1988 to 1990, she was hired by the Opéra de Lyon She played Rosina in The Barber of Seville by Rossini and Norina in Don Pasquale by Gaetano Donizetti. Her interpretation of Sister Constance in Les Dialogues des Carmelites by Francis Poulenc was recorded in 1989–1990. Back in Switzerland in 1999, she played the roles of Blondchen in Die Entführung aus dem Serail by Mozart and Sophie in Werther by Jules Massenet at the Grand Théâtre de Genève. In 2000–2001, at the Lausanne Opéra, she performed Speranza and Ninfa in L'Orfeo by Claudio Monteverdi conducted by Dominique Meyer. and sings in The Rape of Lucrece by Benjamin Britten and Lucio Silla by Wolfgang Amadeus Mozart in various recitals with another Valaisan, Brigitte Balleys. She then became a singing teacher at the Sion conservatory.

Discography 
The Love for Three Oranges by Sergei Prokofiev.

References

External links 
 

20th-century Swiss women opera singers
Swiss sopranos
1961 births
Living people
People from Valais
21st-century Swiss women opera singers
Lausanne Conservatory alumni